Fischbach is a small river of Bavaria, Germany, south-east of Nuremberg. It is a tributary of the Goldbach which discharges into the Pegnitz.

See also
List of rivers of Bavaria

Rivers of Bavaria
Rivers of Germany